Kazimierz Lux (1780–1846) was an officer of the Polish Legions and a pirate in the Caribbean Sea during the early 19th century.

Biography
Lux was born in Warsaw. Upon reaching the age of 15, he joined the Dąbrowski's Legions and fought during the Italian campaign. In 1803 on Napoleaon's order, his semibrigade, commanded  by general Charles Leclerc, was sent to San Domingo to restore French rule over the island which rebelled in 1801.

After pacifying the rebellion, Lux started a career of piracy - shooting and boarding an American brig was one of his more spectacular successes; the vessel was later sold for 20 000 francs in Havana.

After returning to Europe, Lux served in the army of the Duchy of Warsaw. He took part in the Russian campaign; he served as an officer in the army of Congress Poland.

Lux died in Warsaw in 1846.

Further reading
Pachoński, Jan and Reuel K. Wilson. Poland's Caribbean Tragedy: A Study of Polish Legions in the Haitian War of Independence, 1802-1803. Boulder, Colorado: East European Monographs, 1986. 

Polish legionnaires (Napoleonic period)
Polish pirates
Military personnel from Warsaw
1780 births
1846 deaths
19th-century pirates